Central Peace-Notley is a provincial electoral district in Alberta, Canada. The district was one of 87 districts mandated to return a single member (MLA) to the Legislative Assembly of Alberta using the first past the post method of voting. It was contested for the first time in the 2019 Alberta election.

The riding takes its name from its central location in the Peace River Country and from Grant Notley, who represented the region in the Legislature from 1971 to 1984 while serving as leader of the Alberta New Democratic Party.

Geography
Central Peace-Notley is a largely rural riding located in northwestern Alberta.

There are no cities in the riding. Urban municipalities include the towns of Fairview, Falher, Fox Creek, McLennan, Spirit River, and Valleyview, and the villages of Berwyn, Donnelly, Girouxville, Hines Creek, and Rycroft.

Central Peace-Notley also covers the entirety of six rural municipalities (Birch Hills County, Clear Hills County, the Municipal District of Fairview No. 136, the Municipal District of Smoky River No. 130, the Municipal District of Spirit River No. 133, and Saddle Hills County) and portions of two others (the Municipal District of Greenview No. 16 and the Municipal District of Peace No. 135)

The riding contains one of the Treaty 6 reserves of the Alexander First Nation (Alexander 134A) and the Treaty 8 reserves of the Sturgeon Lake Cree Nation, Duncan's First Nation (Duncans 151A) and Horse Lake First Nation (Clear Hills 152C). In addition to a large Indigenous community, the riding is also home to many Franco-Albertans, especially in the Smoky River area.

Clockwise from the north, Central Peace-Notley borders Peace River, Lesser Slave Lake, Athabasca-Barrhead-Westlock, West Yellowhead, Grande Prairie-Wapiti, and the province of British Columbia.

History

The district was created in 2017 when the Electoral Boundaries Commission recommended renaming Dunvegan-Central Peace-Notley and expanding its borders to include the portion of Grande Prairie-Smoky east of the County of Grande Prairie. The district also lost the area around Grimshaw to the district of Peace River.

Central Peace-Notley along with Lesser Slave Lake are one of two electoral districts in Alberta allowed to have a population between 25 per cent and 50 per cent below the provincial average, as it satisfies all five conditions laid out in the Electoral Boundaries Commission Act. Central Peace-Notley was created in 2017 with a population of 28,993 which was 38 per cent below the average population of an electoral district of 46,803.

The district first elected United Conservative MLA Todd Loewen who had previously been elected to Grande Prairie-Smoky electoral district as a Wildrose candidate in 2015. Loewen defeated NDP candidate, Minister of Energy and Dunvegan-Central Peace-Notley district MLA Margaret McCuaig-Boyd by 7,910 votes. On May 13, 2021 Loewen and Cypress-Medicine Hat MLA Drew Barnes were expelled from the United Conservative caucus and became an independent after calling on Premier Kenney to resign.

Electoral results

2019 general election

See also
List of Alberta provincial electoral districts

References

External links
Elections Alberta
The Legislative Assembly of Alberta

Alberta provincial electoral districts
2017 establishments in Alberta
Constituencies established in 2017